Paulo Santos may refer to:
 Paulo Santos (Portuguese footballer) (Paulo Jorge Silva Santos, born 1972), Portuguese football goalkeeper
 Paulo Futre (Paulo Jorge Santos Futre, born 1966), former Portuguese football winger
 Paulo Dos Santos (Cape Verdean footballer) (born 1973), Cape Verdean football midfielder
 Paulo Santos (Brazilian footballer) (born 1960), Brazilian former footballer
 Paulo Roberto Santos (born 1958), Brazilian footballer and manager

See also
 Paulo